Kheyang is the exonym of the Hyow. There Kheyang or the Hyow (খিয়াং), are a group of indigenous people inhabiting in the Chittagong Hill Tracts of Bangladesh and the Rakhine State of Myanmar. The word Kheyang originated in khlɔng (see VanBik, 2009: 3–4), which means person in the language. The endonym Hyow means Chin.  The Khyang are one of the smallest ethnic groups in Bangladesh with a population of only 2,345 according to the 1991 census. At present, the approximate number of the Khyang in Bangladesh is 4500. They live in Kaptai and Chandraghona in Rangamati Hill District and in Bandarban Sadar, Thanchi and Rowangcchari upazila in Bandarban District.
. In Myanmar, they live in the Myebon, Minbya and Ann townships of the Rakhine State.

History
According to Kheyang chronicles, the Khyangs with their king entered Chittagong Hill Tracts when their kingdom in Burma was overrun by the Burmese. But afterwards the king decided to go back to Burma. But his younger queen being pregnant could not accompany him. Hence she was left behind with some followers and kinsmen. The present Kheyang are the descendants of this queen and her retinue. However, the literature of the Burmese history tells that the Kheyang migrated with the Marma from the southern Myanmar in the late eighteenth century. The Kheyang have two groups in Bangladesh: Laitu and Kongtu. The Kheyang were Buddhists but many converted to Christianity during the British period. Most Khyang today are under the Mong family or the "Royal Family" which is from Chandraghona, Rangamati Hill Districts in Bangladesh.

Social system
Every Khyang society has a leader who is called 'Karbari' or 'Headman'. Kheyang society has a patriarchal structure. The father of a family is the master of the house. If a village lacks a headman, the villagers unitedly appoint a leader. The leader solves all the disputes that may develop among the villagers and, thus, helps them live in peace. If a person is accused of any criminal wrongdoing, the headman takes steps in line with customary social laws.

The accused is generally punished or forgiven, and the judgement is passed in front of all after measuring the enormity of the misdeed. Both the male and female of the Kheyang community are very industrious. Men dominate and especially follow the laws of society.

See also 
 Persecution of Buddhists in Bangladesh
 Tribal people in Chittagong Hill Tracts

References

 http://www.ebbd.info/khyengs-religious-festivals.html

Ethnic groups in Bangladesh